Guy Ritchie's The Covenant (or simply, The Covenant) is an upcoming action thriller film co-written, co-produced and directed by Guy Ritchie. The film stars Jake Gyllenhaal and Dar Salim, and is scheduled to be released theatrically in the United States on April 21, 2023, by Metro-Goldwyn-Mayer.

Plot summary
During the War in Afghanistan, U.S. sergeant John Kinley recruits Ahmed to interpret with local Afghans during their mission in Afghanistan. Ahmed agrees in pursuit of revenge against the Taliban for the death of his son. When the soldiers' platoon confronts the Taliban in the desert, they are caught off guard and Kinley is knocked down. Before he can be captured, Ahmed rescues Kinley by dragging him through the desert mountains to avoid the Taliban. Kinley then returns to the United States, but soon learns Ahmed is pursued by the Taliban and is holed up somewhere in Afghanistan. When U.S. authorities refuse to respond, Kinley himself travels back to Afghanistan to rescue the friend who risked his life for a total stranger.

Cast
 Jake Gyllenhaal as Sergeant John Kinley
 Dar Salim as Ahmed
 Alexander Ludwig
 Antony Starr
 Jason Wong
 Jonny Lee Miller
 Bobby Schofield
 Sean Sagar
 Sina Parvaneh
 Emily Beecham
 Cyrus Khodaveisi 
 Christian Ochoa

Production
It was announced in October 2021 that Jake Gyllenhaal was cast to star in the film, to be directed by Guy Ritchie, and co-written with Ivan Atkinson and Marn Davies. In January 2022, Metro-Goldwyn-Mayer bought U.S. distribution rights to the film, planning to distribute it via their United Artists Releasing joint venture (which Amazon folded into MGM itself in 2023), while STXfilms co-financed the film and handled international sales, Amazon Prime Video acquired some international distribution rights, as well as post-theatrical streaming rights in the United States.

Filming began in February 2022 in Alicante, Spain, with Dar Salim, Alexander Ludwig, Antony Starr, Jason Wong, Bobby Schofield, Sean Sagar, Christian Ochoa and Emily Beecham added to the cast. Initially titled The Interpreter, it was revealed by Ritchie in December 2022 that the title had been changed to The Covenant.

Release
The film is scheduled to be released in the United States on 21 April 2023 by Metro-Goldwyn-Mayer and internationally by Amazon Prime Video.

References

External links
 

Films shot in the province of Alicante
Films set in Afghanistan
Films directed by Guy Ritchie
Upcoming films
American action thriller films
British action thriller films
Metro-Goldwyn-Mayer films
STX Entertainment films
Amazon Studios films